Kotan may refer to:

 Kotań, a village in Poland
 Fatma Salman Kotan (born 1970), Turkish politician
 Egba Kotan II, Yoruba ruler from Benin
 Kotan, an Ainu village

See also 
 Cotan (disambiguation)
 Qotan, a village in Iran
 Kutan (disambiguation)